The Cageworld series is a science fiction series by Colin Kapp which takes place in a distant future where humanity lives on nested Dyson spheres. The four books are Search for the Sun (1982) (also published as Cageworld); The Lost Worlds of Cronus (1982); The Tyrant of Hades (1984) and Star Search (1984).

External links
 Cageworld series on Goodreads

Space opera novels
Science fiction book series
1982 books
1984 books
DAW Books books
Book series introduced in 1982